Krishna Gopal Patel is an Indian politician and a member of the Sixteenth Legislative Assembly of Uttar Pradesh in India. He represents the Nighasan constituency of Uttar Pradesh and is a member of the Samajwadi Party political party.

Early life and education
Krishna  Gopal Patel was born in  Meerut. He attended the Chaudhary Charan Singh University and attained BA, LLB & MA degrees and later on shifted to lakhimpur kheri with his family.

Political career
Krishna Gopal Patel has been a MLA for one term. He represented the Nighasan constituency and is a member of the Samajwadi Party political party. Patel was elected in the 2014 By-election after the sitting MLA Ajay Kumar Mishra was elected to the 16th Lok Sabha.

Posts held

See also
 Nighasan (Assembly constituency)
 Sixteenth Legislative Assembly of Uttar Pradesh
 Uttar Pradesh Legislative Assembly

References 

Samajwadi Party politicians
Uttar Pradesh MLAs 2012–2017
Chaudhary Charan Singh University alumni
People from Lakhimpur Kheri district
1958 births
Living people